Pamela M. Pilbeam (born 1941) is an English historian, lecturer and professor emeritus at the Royal Holloway, University of London. She specializes in the history of France since 1789, especially in the 19th century.

Pilbeam has been a professor at the Royal Holloway, University of London since 1995, and is an emeritus professor . She is a president of the Society for the Study of French History.

Works 
 The Middle Classes in Europe, 1789-1914 (1990)
 The 1830 Revolution in France (1991)
 Republicanism in nineteenth-Century France (1995)
 Themes in Modern European History, 1780-1830 (1995)
 The Constitutional Monarchy in France, 1814-48 (1999)
 French Socialists before Marx. Workers, Women and the Social Question in France (2000)
 Madame Tussaud and the History of Waxworks (2003)

External links
 Profile at Royal Holloway University of London website
 Profile at Dept of History, Classics and Archaeology, Birkbeck, University of London

1941 births
English historians
Historians of France
Academics of Royal Holloway, University of London
Living people